Ernest Ralston (May 1, 1935 – February 2, 1990) was an American politician. He served as a Democratic member for the 7th district of the Georgia House of Representatives.

Life and career 
Ralston was born in Gordon County, Georgia. He attended New Mexico State University and served in the United States Army. He was a rancher.

In 1977, Ralston was elected to represent the 7th district of the Georgia House of Representatives. He served until 1983, when he was succeeded by J. C. Maddox.

Ralston died in February 1990, at the age of 54.

References 

1935 births
1990 deaths
People from Gordon County, Georgia
Democratic Party members of the Georgia House of Representatives
20th-century American politicians
New Mexico State University alumni